Ship Canal House is a building in Manchester, England, which was built in 1927 for the Manchester Ship Canal Company. The building is located on King Street, historically the centre for Manchester's banking industry.

The building was designed by Harry S Fairhurst in a neo-classical style and displays some Art Deco and Edwardian Baroque motifs such as square windows and roof sculptures which were prevalent during the 1920s. It stands 46 metres tall with 11 storeys and is clad in Portland stone.  It was one of the tallest office blocks in the United Kingdom when completed in 1927. The building built by J. Gerrard & Sons Ltd of Swinton was Grade II listed in 1982. Ship Canal House was sold in 2011 for £22.8 million.

References

Grade II listed buildings in Manchester
Office buildings completed in 1927
Limestone buildings in the United Kingdom